is the name given to the collection of Japanese artists who gained national popularity during the late 1970s. Continuing through the early 1980s, the collective had little in common other than their origin - the Hakata ward of Fukuoka City. The phrase, Mentai Rock, was derived from the name of a local delicacy, mentaiko, made from roe. Many believed that their origin also had a common influence on the overall sound, despite the wide variety of genres represented.

Mentai Rockers 

Sheena & the Rokkets
The Roosters(z)
The Rockers
A.R.B.

山部善次郎(YAMAZEN)
Accidents
Modern Dollz
HEATWAVE
Zi:LiE-YA
Rock'n'Roll Gypsies

Post-Mentai Rockers 
Blankey Jet City
Thee Michelle Gun Elephant
Shiina Ringo
Group Tamashi
Number Girl
Mo'some Tonebender
Tokyo Ska Paradise Orchestra
Katteni-Shiyagare
King Brothers
Gyogun Rend's
The Neatbeats
Ajico
Losalios
Rosso
Zazen Boys
Radio Caroline

References

External links 
Mentai Rock in its various forms is not well documented in English. Occasional articles appear in the local press, so it's worth checking out Fukuoka Now or Japanzine if you are interested in reading more.
 Article on the history of the Fukuoka Live Scene

Japanese music
Fukuoka